Paradevosia shaoguanensis is a Gram-negative, rod-shaped and aerobic bacteria from the family of Paradevosia with a single polar flagellum which has been isolated from coking wastewater in China.

References

Hyphomicrobiales
Bacteria described in 2015